Dendrosenecio adnivalis (synonym Senecio adnivalis) is one of the giant groundsels of the mountains of Eastern Africa. D. adnivalis grows on the Rwenzori Mountains  
and on the Virunga Mountains 
in Uganda and the Democratic Republic of Congo.

Description
The stems have 25 to 60 leaves densely packed in a rosette shape at the top. Old leaves are persistent, withered leaf-bases covering the stalk for 1 to 3 meters below the leaf-rosettes. The droopy flower heads have 9 to 20 ray florets, 16 millimeters long or no ray florets at all and 90 to 250 disc florets.

Distribution
The Congo Basin is very wet; humid air is trapped by the mountains and rain falls on most days even in the drier months.  Above 2500 meters (8,200 ft) clouds can persist for several days making the Rwenzori and the Virunga a wetter environment than the other East African mountains.
Dendrosenecio adnivalis lives at altitudes of 3,000 to 3,800 meters (9,800 to 12,000 feet) on the Rwenzori Mountains with another giant groundsel, Dendrosenecio johnstonii. D. adnivalis more common on the wetter soils.

On the Virunga Mountains groves of Senecio stanleyi (Dendrosenecio adnivalis) grow after the tree heaths (Erica sp.) in clearings along with Lobelia wollastonii until the altitude of 4,300 meters (14,000 feet) when vegetation becomes sparse.

Synonyms
The herbarium has all of the Dendrosenecio adnivalis specimens filed under Senecio johnstonii  and indeed, one is probably a variety or subspecies of the other that adapted to live closer to water and on damper ground.

A synonym for Senecio stanleyi is Dendrosenecio adnivalis (Stapf) E.B.Knox var. petiolatus (Hedberg) E.B.Knox; for this article, Senecio stanleyi was considered to be a synonym of Dendrosenecio adnivalis.

References

External links

adnivalis
Endemic flora of Kenya
Rwenzori Mountains
Virunga Mountains
Afromontane flora